Shahrestan (also known as Shahr Setan) is a village in Mangur-e Gharbi Rural District, in the Central District of Piranshahr County, West Azerbaijan Province, Iran. At the 2006 census, its population was 501, in 57 families.

References 

Populated places in Piranshahr County